Gloucester County, New York is a former county in New York that became part of the state of Vermont.  It was a part of Albany County in the Province of New York until 1770 and was lost to Vermont in 1777.  At that time, Vermont was holding itself out as the Republic of Vermont and did not become a state until 1791.

The County of Gloucester name was used occasionally in contemporary documents. Yet the 28 February 1770 Order for Erection and many subsequent documents refer to the region as the County of Glocester. Contemporary maps also refer to the area as the County of Glocester.

References

See also 
List of counties in Vermont 
List of former United States counties

Former counties of the United States
History of New York (state)
Pre-statehood history of Vermont
1770 establishments in the Province of New York